Gerald Sparrow (1903–1988) was a British lawyer, judge and travel writer. He served on the International Court in Bangkok, Thailand, for over 20 years. He was the president of the Club of Ten, a pro-apartheid organization, and the author of over 40 books.

Early life
Gerald Sparrow was born in 1903 in Chapel-en-le-Frith, Derbyshire. He attended Sherborne School in Dorset, then Trinity Hall, University of Cambridge, where he was the president of the Cambridge Union Society.

Career
Sparrow practised as a barrister in Manchester in the mid-1920s, then (invited by the Crown Prince) emigrated to Siam (now Thailand), where he was appointed, in 1930 and aged only 26 or 27, as a judge on the International Court (which tried cases involving non-Thais) in Bangkok. He served on the court "for two decades". He was also the author of "over 40 books, mostly about travel".

Sparrow was the president of the Club of Ten, a pro-apartheid organization whose members included South African, British, American businessmen. One of them was Lampas Nichas, a "South African fertiliser millionaire." However, the club was founded by Connie Mulder and Eschel Rhoodie, and the real aim was to publish "advertisements in the newspapers and otherwise do publicity work extolling the policies of the South African government". Sparrow opposed the sporting boycott of South Africa in 1974. He later recanted his views.

Personal life and death
Sparrow married a Thai, and he lived in Thailand for 23 years. He was interned under harsh conditions by the Japanese, after their 1941 invasion of Thailand (the name adopted 1939-46 and 1948–present). Sparrow resigned as a judge after the war, and opened a private law office in Bangkok, dealing mainly in commercial law. He retired in England, where he became well known for his books, particularly the long series entitled The Great Forgers, The Great Traitors etc., which mixed famous and infamous criminal cases (and a few civil cases) from history with other cases which Sparrow knew, often personally, from his time in Thailand. He died in 1988.

Selected works

References

1903 births
1988 deaths
Alumni of the University of Cambridge
British expatriates in Thailand
English travel writers
20th-century English judges
Presidents of the Cambridge Union